Lancelot Stafford (11 January 1887 – 15 June 1940) was a British athlete. He competed in the men's standing long jump and the men's standing high jump events at the 1908 Summer Olympics.

References

1887 births
1940 deaths
Athletes (track and field) at the 1908 Summer Olympics
English male high jumpers
English male long jumpers
Olympic athletes of Great Britain
Athletes from London